Wilford G. Chapman (born June 29, 1860, Portland, Maine; died September 2, 1920, Portland, Maine) was an American lawyer and politician. A Republican, Chapman served as Mayor of Portland from 1916–1917. He was the first Republican to do so in five years. He was also a founding member of the Rotary Club of Portland, Maine. He was later a judge in the Portland Municipal Court.

References

1860 births
1920 deaths
Mayors of Portland, Maine
Maine lawyers
Maine Republicans